Langli Subdistrict (or ) is a subdistrict in Changsha County, Changsha, Hunan province, China. It contains five villages and three communities, with the government in Langli Community. It was a town until 2012.

Religion
Taogong Palace is a Taoist temple in the subdistrict.

References 

Divisions of Changsha County
Changsha County